Absolution is a 1991 novel by Olaf Olafsson about the mind of a man haunted by the crime he planned half a century earlier.

Synopsis
When he died, Peter Peterson left behind the trappings of a seemingly charmed life: a vast fortune, two children, and a stately Park Avenue address. But he left something else behind: a sheaf of confessions about a dark period of his youth. In pages written weeks before his death, he reveals a crime of passion, committed in the throes of unrequited love, that has burdened him for his entire life. Yet as he finishes his story, he encounters a surprise that will shake the very foundation of his past. Spanning a boyhood in Iceland to the Nazi occupation of Denmark to a cunning business career in modern-day Manhattan, Absolution echoes Dostoevsky and Ibsen as it masterfully plumbs the darkest corners of a sinister mind and a wounded heart.

Critical reception
“Compulsive reading, and the spare, dry language concentrates the suspense…As cold and lucid as a quartz crystal.” – The Independent on Sunday (UK)

References

External links
 Random House
 Olaf Olafsson's official website

Icelandic novels
Pantheon Books books
1994 American novels
Novels set in Iceland
Novels set in Denmark
Novels set in New York City
Novels set in New York (state)
Icelandic-language novels
1991 novels